Black Spring or Black Springs may refer to:

Arts and entertainment
 Black Spring (EP), a 1991 EP by Lush
 "Black Springs", a song by Total Control from the 2014 album Typical System
 Black Spring (short stories), a 1939 book by Henry Miller
 Black Spring Press, a British publisher

Places
 Black Springs, Arkansas, a town in the U.S.
 Black Springs, New South Wales, a village in Australia
 Black Springs, South Australia, a locality and former township in Australia
 Black Spring ('Mustallikas'), part of the Saula Blue Springs in Estonia
 Black Springs Creek, a watercourse in the Australian Capital Territory

Other uses
 Black Spring (Algeria), a 2001 series of demonstrations in Kabylie, Algeria
 Black Spring (Cuba), a 2003 crackdown on Havava dissidents